Transcription initiation factor TFIID subunit 2 is a protein that in humans is encoded by the TAF2 gene.

Initiation of transcription by RNA polymerase II requires the activities of more than 70 polypeptides. The protein that coordinates these activities is transcription factor IID (TFIID), which binds to the core promoter to position the polymerase properly, serves as the scaffold for assembly of the remainder of the transcription complex, and acts as a channel for regulatory signals. TFIID is composed of the TATA binding protein (TBP) and a group of evolutionarily conserved proteins known as TBP-associated factors or TAFs. TAFs may participate in basal transcription, serve as coactivators, function in promoter recognition or modify general transcription factors (GTFs) to facilitate complex assembly and transcription initiation. This gene encodes one of the larger subunits of TFIID that is stably associated with the TFIID complex. It contributes to interactions at and downstream of the transcription initiation site, interactions that help determine transcription complex response to activators.

References

Further reading

External links
 
 

Transcription factors